David William Abbott (8 June 1934 – 5 March 2016) was a New Zealand cricket umpire.

Born in Longbenton, Northumberland, England, in 1934, Abbott moved to Wellington, New Zealand, where he was a cricket umpire for over 50 years. He stood in one match at the 1982 Women's Cricket World Cup between India and the International XI, and one first-class match between Wellington and Canterbury in the 1977–78 season.

Abbott died of cancer in Lower Hutt on 5 March 2016.

References

1934 births
2016 deaths
People from Longbenton
Sportspeople from Tyne and Wear
British emigrants to New Zealand
New Zealand cricket umpires
Deaths from cancer in New Zealand